Lawrence P. Ressler (August 10, 1848 – June 12, 1918) was an American professional baseball player.

Biography
Larry Ressler was born in Alsace-Lorraine, France on October 10, 1848, and came to the United States in 1857. He enlisted in the 213th Pennsylvania Infantry Regiment at 14, and served for one year during the Civil War, before his mother arranged to have him discharged due to his age. Before playing baseball professionally, he worked as a molder.

He was the captain and manager of the Reading Actives in the minor leagues, and for the Washington Nationals during the 1875 season. He was the first French-born Major League Baseball player.

In later life he managed hotels, and was a police sergeant and civil servant. He was active in Democratic politics.

Larry Ressler died from gastritis at St. Joseph's Hospital in Reading, Pennsylvania on June 12, 1918.

References

External links

Major League Baseball players from France
Washington Nationals (NA) players
19th-century baseball players
1848 births
1918 deaths
Major League Baseball outfielders
Erie (minor league baseball) players
People from Alsace-Lorraine
Reading Actives players
Union Army soldiers